Alexander Yuryevich Nesterov (born September 30, 1985) is a Russian professional ice hockey forward who currently playing with Arlan Kokshetau of the Kazakhstan Hockey Championship (KHC). He formerly played with HC Lada Togliatti in the Kontinental Hockey League (KHL).

References

External links

1985 births
Living people
Admiral Vladivostok players
Arlan Kokshetau players
Atlant Moscow Oblast players
Avtomobilist Yekaterinburg players
HC Lada Togliatti players
Salavat Yulaev Ufa players
HC Sibir Novosibirsk players
HC Spartak Moscow players
Ice hockey people from Moscow
Russian ice hockey forwards